The Pio Manzù International Research Centre, commonly referred to as the Pio Manzu Research Centre or Pio Manzu Centre, is a non-governmental environmental organization of the United Nations founded in 1969 and based in Rimini, Italy. The purpose of the centre to serve as an "institute for the in-depth study of the main economic and scientific aspects of the relationship between man and his environment". The centre holds an annual conference in Rimini, Italy, along with carrying out research projects and publishing the journal Environmental Structures.

As of 2007, the Pio Manzù Center has Lorenzo Cagnoni as president, Roberto Valducci as vice-president, and Gerardo Filiberto Dasi as general secretary. The centre also has an International Scientific Committee where Mikhail Gorbachev is president and Giandomenico Picco is vice-president.

History 
The Pio Manzù International Research Centre was founded in 1969 by Girardo Filiberto Dasi and 14 other academics.

The centre was named in honor of Italian designer Pio Manzù after he died in a car crash. Manzu was also a founding member of the International Research Centre on Environmental Structures and designed cars including the Fiat 127.

Annual conference 
The centre has hosted an annual conference in Rimini, Italy, since the founding of the centre in 1969. During this conference, the centre's International Scientific Committee also awards the Medal of the President of the Italian Republic and the Gold Medal of the Pio Manzu Centre.

Recipients of Gold Medals include Henry Kissinger, Gro Harlem Brundtland Diana, Princess of Wales, Javier Pérez de Cuéllar, Rita Levi-Montalcini, James Robertson and Daniel Isenberg.

Recipients of the Medal of the President of the Italian Republic include Ivan Eland (2004) Michael Albert (2004), Deepak Chopra, Giuseppe Anedda, and Angélique Kidjo

References 

Italy and the United Nations
Environmental agencies
United Nations organizations based in Europe
Environmental organisations based in Italy
Organizations established in 1969
Scientific organizations established in 1969
Research institutes established in 1969